Laphria cinerea is a species of robber flies in the family Asilidae.

References

Further reading

External links

 Diptera.info

cinerea